if(we) is a social and mobile technology company based in San Francisco, California. and owned by The Meet Group.  It was originally known as Tagged Inc. and owns and operates social networks Tagged.com and Hi5.com and animated iOS messaging app Nod.

The company operates as an incubator of new social technology and apps seeking to find the next big thing. The firm has been ranked the #3 Best Place to Work in the Bay Area for medium size companies and has 140 employees.

History
The company was created when it acquired Tinode and announced that it would begin working on additional social products besides Tagged and Hi5. It also announced that it would drop plans of pursuing an IPO and concentrate on new social opportunities. If(we) is planning to release a messaging app as its first new product. The company had $57 million in revenue in 2013 and has been profitable since 2008. In March 2017 the company was acquired by MeetMe.

Online Brands

Nod
The company released Nod in the app store in July 2015. Nod is a messaging app that features customizable avatars and emoji animations. Apple selected Nod as a best new app.

Digsby
Digsby is a real-time communications download that connects multiple Instant Messaging services such as AIM, MSN, ICQ and Facebook in one application. It was founded at The Rochester Institute of Technology and was bought in April 2011 as the first acquisition by the company. Digsby was subsequently open sourced by if(we) in 2012.

hi5
Once one of the top 3 social networks, the company acquired hi5 in December 2011 and merged it into the features on Tagged while operating it as a separate site and brand.

Sidewalk
Sidewalk is a stand-alone app for local neighborhood discovery. It is available only in San Francisco.

Swoon
Swoon is an Android dating app similar to Tinder application  where people swipe through photographs and indicate their interest in meeting similar to the site Hot or Not. When two people both express mutual interest a match is made and people are invited to online chat with each other.

Tagged
Tagged is a social discovery service available on the web and mobile apps designed for meeting new people and dating. It was originally a social network but pivoted to be a site to meet new people in 2007. It also offers social games as part of its features. It became profitable in 2008 and had $43 million in revenue in 2011.

See also  
 List of digital distribution platforms for mobile devices
 List of mobile software distribution platforms
 HTML5
 JQuery Mobile
 Mobile application management
 Mobile business intelligence
 Mobile computing
 Mobile Marketing
 Multi-channel app development

References

External links

Companies based in San Francisco
Internet properties established in 2004
 
2004 establishments in California
2017 mergers and acquisitions